Speedstar (stylised as speedstar* pre-2004) were an Australian alternative rock band from Brisbane, Queensland formed in 1995. After a series of EPs in 2002 they released their first album, Bruises You Can Touch, produced by Steve James. They followed it up with 2004's Forget the Sun, Just Hold On which was produced by Tony Doogan.

Discography

Albums

EPs

Singles
"Revolution" (2002) – EMI
"This Everyday Life" (2002) – EMI
"Unbreakable" (2004) – EMI
"Are You Feeling Better Angela?" (2005) – EMI

References

External links
Speedstar MySpace page
Sydney Morning Herald 15 April 2002 Bluebottle Kiss, Speedstar by Sacha Molitorisz
Australian Musician Issue 38 Winter 2004  Speedstar by Greg Phillips

Australian alternative rock groups
Musical groups from Brisbane
Musical groups established in 1995
Musical groups disestablished in 2006